Imogen Byron (born 8 March 1996 in London) is an English actress. She had roles in Holby City, Last Chance Harvey, Pickles: The Dog Who Won the World Cup, and Messiah: The Harrowing.

Filmography

Television

| 
|-
| 2016
| People Just Do Nothing
| Groupie 1
| Series 3, Episode 5 "Ipswich"
|}

Stage

Film

References

 

1996 births
Living people
English actresses